Franc O'Shea is a bassist born in Swaziland. He has worked with artists including Steve Howe (Yes), Lisa Moorish, Mike Lindup (Level 42), Bah Samba, members of Jamiroquai and Beverley Martyn. His playing covers a variety of styles including jazz, Latin, rock, world music and flamenco. He released a solo album entitled Esprit, in 1999 and has recently collaborated with members of Paco de Lucia and Chick Corea's bands on his latest album, Alkimia, including Jorge Pardo, Rubem Dantas, and Juan Manuel Canizares, as well as Benjamin Sarfas, Philippe Barnes, Nan Mercader, Chema Vilchez, Serguei Sapricheff, etc. He currently teaches at the British and Irish Modern Music Institute and lives in the UK.

References

External links
 Franc O'Shea's Myspace page

Living people
Year of birth missing (living people)
Swazi emigrants to the United Kingdom